Aliann Tabitha Omalara Pompey  (born 9 March 1978) is a Guyanese sprinter who specializes in the 400 metres. She has represented Guyana at the Summer Olympics on four separate occasions (2000, 2004, 2008 and 2012). She has competed at the World Championships in Athletics eleven times.

Pompey won the gold medal at the 2002 Commonwealth Games and also won a bronze medal at the 2003 Pan American Games. She holds the South American indoor record for the 400 m. 
She participated at the World Championships in Athletics in 2001, 2003, 2005, 2007, 2009 and 2011 as well as the IAAF World Indoor Championships in 2001, 2003 2004, 2006 and 2010 and the Summer Olympics in 2000, 2004 and 2008 and 2012 without reaching the final. Her personal best time is 50.71 seconds, achieved in August 2009 at the World Championships in Berlin.

Born in Georgetown, Guyana, she moved to the United States at the age of 14 and graduated from Cohoes High School, and then Manhattan College in The Bronx, New York City. Initially uninterested in track and field, she began to take running seriously in 1995, quickly reducing her 400 metres best time to 53 seconds and winning the state championships. She won the 400 m at the 2000 NCAA Women's Indoor Track and Field Championship, becoming the Manhattan Jaspers' first ever female national champion. She received her bachelor's degree from Manhattan College in 1999.

Personal bests

All information taken from IAAF profile.

Competition record

References

External links
 
 
 
 
 
 Aliann T. O. Pompey Interview

1978 births
Living people
Sportspeople from Georgetown, Guyana
Guyanese female sprinters
Athletes (track and field) at the 2002 Commonwealth Games
Athletes (track and field) at the 2006 Commonwealth Games
Athletes (track and field) at the 2010 Commonwealth Games
Athletes (track and field) at the 1999 Pan American Games
Athletes (track and field) at the 2003 Pan American Games
Athletes (track and field) at the 2007 Pan American Games
Athletes (track and field) at the 2000 Summer Olympics
Athletes (track and field) at the 2004 Summer Olympics
Athletes (track and field) at the 2008 Summer Olympics
Athletes (track and field) at the 2012 Summer Olympics
Olympic athletes of Guyana
Manhattan College alumni
Pan American Games bronze medalists for Guyana
Pan American Games medalists in athletics (track and field)
Commonwealth Games gold medallists for Guyana
Commonwealth Games silver medallists for Guyana
Commonwealth Games medallists in athletics
World Athletics Championships athletes for Guyana
Afro-Guyanese people
Central American and Caribbean Games silver medalists for Guyana
Competitors at the 2006 Central American and Caribbean Games
Competitors at the 2010 Central American and Caribbean Games
Central American and Caribbean Games medalists in athletics
Medalists at the 2003 Pan American Games
Olympic female sprinters
Medallists at the 2002 Commonwealth Games
Medallists at the 2010 Commonwealth Games